Tillett or Tillet may refer to:
 Tillett (surname)
 Ibbs and Tillett, a 20th-century UK classical music promotion agency 
 Tillett Islands in Antarctica
 Hôtel du Tillet de la Bussière in Paris, France
 Mason–Tillett House in Virginia, U.S.